, born as Mitsuko Shiratori, was a Japanese manga artist, feminist essayist and poet. She was associated with the alternative manga magazine Garo.

Life 
She made her debut as a professional manga artist in 1969 in Osamu Tezuka's avantgarde magazine COM and had formal art training before becoming a manga artist. When COM stopped being published, she started working for Garo magazine instead. Her first short story in Garo was "Aa Seken-sama" in 1971. For another short story, "Kaze no Fuku Koro", she won a Honorable Mention at the Big Comic Award associated with the Big Comic magazine.

After this, she put her career on hiatus because of marriage and raising her children. She returned to Garo in 1978 and also started publishing essays, illustrations and poetry in literary magazines. From 1981 until 1984, she published the feminist manga series Talk to My Back in Garo, which dealt with being a housewife, a failing marriage and the pressure of raising children.

Yamada ran for a seat in the 1989 Japanese House of Councillors election as part of the Chikyū Club political organization.

From 2006 on, she taught at Kyoto Seika University's Faculty of Manga. In 2007, she also moved to Kyoto.

Yamada died at Kyoto Hospital on May 5, 2009, age 60, due to intracerebral hemorrhage.

Style 
Her works are described as being pictorial I Novels.

Impact 
Frederik L. Schodt regarded her work as particularly important because of the feminist message, rare in shōjo manga. Yamada influenced Hinako Sugiura and Yōko Kondō, her former assistants. The three of them were referred to as the "Three Garo Girls" (ガロ三人娘 Garo san'nin musume).

Works

Sources:

References

External links
Google books 

1948 births
2009 deaths
Manga artists
Women manga artists
Artists from Kyoto
People from Tokyo
Japanese female comics artists
Japanese feminists
Japanese poets
Writers from Kyoto